Opatkowice  is a village in the administrative district of Gmina Puławy, within Puławy County, Lublin Voivodeship, in eastern Poland.

References

Opatkowice